Hominy Creek may refer to:

Hominy Creek (Georgia), a stream in Georgia
Hominy Creek (Pomme de Terre River), a stream in Missouri
Hominy Creek (West Virginia), a stream in West Virginia